The United States's Fulcrum nuclear test series was a group of 21 nuclear tests conducted in 1976–1977. These tests  followed the Operation Anvil (nuclear test) series and preceded the Operation Cresset series.

References

Explosions in 1976
Explosions in 1977
1976 in military history
1977 in military history
Fulcrum